The Outer Holm of Skaw is a small, uninhabited islet, a rock outlier off the northeast coast of the island of Whalsay, in the Shetland Islands of Scotland.

Location

Gallery

References
Citations

Sources

Islets of Whalsay
Uninhabited islands of Shetland